Thomas Knox, 1st Earl of Ranfurly (5 August 1754 – 26 April 1840), styled The Honourable Thomas Knox between 1781 and 1818 and known as The Viscount Northland between 1818 and 1831, was an Irish peer and politician.

Background
Ranfurly was the eldest son of Thomas Knox, 1st Viscount Northland, and the Hon. Anne, daughter of John Vesey, 1st Baron Knapton.

Political career
Ranfurly was elected a member of the Irish House of Commons for Carlingford in 1776, a seat he held until 1783, and then represented Dungannon between 1783 and 1790 and Tyrone between 1790 and 1798. He was also a member of the British House of Commons for County Tyrone from 1806 to 1812. 

On 18 May 1793 he was commissioned as Lieutenant-Colonel and second-in-command of the newly raised Royal Tyrone Militia. He  commanded the regiment on garrison duty for a year, resigning in 1794.

In 1818 he succeeded his father in the viscountcy of Northland, but, as this was an Irish peerage it did not entitle him to a seat in the House of Lords. However, in 1826 he was created Baron Ranfurly, of Ramphorlie in the County of Renfrew, in the Peerage of the United Kingdom, which entitled him and his successors to a seat in the upper chamber of parliament. In 1831 he was further honoured when he was made Earl of Ranfurly in the Peerage of Ireland.

Family
Lord Ranfurly married his cousin the Honourable Diana Jane, daughter of Edmund Pery, 1st Viscount Pery and Elizabeth Vesey, in 1785. Their second son the Honourable Edmund Knox (1787–1867) was an Admiral in the Royal Navy. Lady Ranfurly died in November 1839. Lord Ranfurly only survived her by a few months and died in April 1840, aged 85. He was succeeded in his titles by his eldest son, Thomas. His brothers included bishops William Knox and Edmund Knox, George Knox , and Archdeacon Charles Knox.

References

External links

1754 births
1840 deaths
Irish MPs 1776–1783
Irish MPs 1783–1790
Irish MPs 1790–1797
Members of the Parliament of the United Kingdom for County Tyrone constituencies (1801–1922)
UK MPs 1806–1807
UK MPs 1807–1812
UK MPs who inherited peerages
UK MPs who were granted peerages
Members of the Parliament of Ireland (pre-1801) for County Louth constituencies
Members of the Parliament of Ireland (pre-1801) for County Tyrone constituencies
Tyrone Militia officers 
Earls of Ranfurly
Peers of the United Kingdom created by George IV
Peers of Ireland created by William IV